Power Volley Milano is an Italian professional volleyball club based in Milan, Lombardy, Italy. They currently compete in the SuperLega, where they have been since the 2014–15 season. In the 2021/22 season, the club is named Allianz Milano.

Honours

European competitions
 CEV Challenge Cup
 Winners (×1): 2020-21

History
Power Volley Milano was founded in 2010 as Power Volleyball. They competed in the 2010–11 Serie B2, and immediately gained promotion at the end of the season. However, following the sale of the club from Parabiago Volleyball, the club dissolved. They were refounded in 2012 as the current Power Volley Milano, and finished the 2012–13 Serie B1 season in 3rd place, gaining promotion to Serie A2. Following this season, the club was purchased by Wolves Volleyball Santa Croce. In the 2013–14 Serie A2 season, Power Volley finished 6th. At the end of the season, the club was sold for a third time, this time being purchased by Callipo Sport. For the 2014–15 season, Power Volley were admitted to the SuperLega for the first time. They finished their inaugural season in the top flight in 12th place, followed by an 11th place finish in the following season.

Team
Team roster – season 2022/2023

COVID-19 pandemic 
The club is related to COVID-19 pandemic in Estonia. They participated in the 2019–20 CEV Challenge Cup matches held in Saaremaa island on 4 and 5 March. On 9 March 5 Milan players had been diagnosed with fever before a league match. On March 11 there was a report on the two first cases on the island. The infected in Saaremaa included the CEO of the Saaremaa VK volleyball club. By March 14 there were 31 COVID-19 cases in Saaremaa and all Western Estonian islands were closed down to all but residents, but the cases had already spread to the mainland. Saare County was also the hardest hit county in Estonia by the COVID-19 in the beginning of the pandemic – it only has 2.5% of the population of Estonia, but had over half of all hospitalized patients.

Title Sponsor

References

External links
Official website
SuperLega profile
Team profile at Volleybox.net

Italian volleyball clubs